Samuel Piasecký (born 31 October 1984) is a Slovak gymnast. He competed at the 2012 Summer Olympics.

References

External links
 

1984 births
Living people
Slovak male artistic gymnasts
Olympic gymnasts of Slovakia
Gymnasts at the 2012 Summer Olympics
Sportspeople from Košice